Zootopia (known as Zootropolis in some regions) is a 2016 American 3D computer-animated buddy comedy film produced by Walt Disney Animation Studios and released by Walt Disney Pictures. The film was directed by Byron Howard and Rich Moore and was based on a screenplay written by Jared Bush (who also co-directed) and Phil Johnston. Zootopia focuses on the unlikely partnership between an ambitious rabbit police officer, Judy Hopps (voiced by Ginnifer Goodwin) and a crafty red fox con artist, Nick Wilde (voiced by Jason Bateman) as they uncover a conspiracy behind the mysterious disappearance of predators from a mammalian metropolis.

The film premiered on February 11, 2016, in Denmark before going into wide release in more than 3,800 theaters in the United States and Canada on March 4. It debuted in first place on its opening weekend earning more than $75 million. Zootopia grossed a worldwide total of over $1 billion at the box office on a production budget of $150 million. Rotten Tomatoes, a review aggregator surveyed 277 reviews, and judged 97% to be positive.

Zootopia garnered a variety of awards and nominations, many of them in the Best Animated Feature category. At the 89th Academy Awards, the film won Best Animated Feature. It also won the Golden Globe Award for Best Animated Feature Film and was nominated for the BAFTA Award for Best Animated Film, losing to Kubo and the Two Strings. At the 44th Annie Awards, Zootopia received eleven nominations and won six including Best Animated Feature and Outstanding Achievement, Voice Acting in an Animated Feature Production for Bateman. The film won Best Animated Motion Picture at the 28th Producers Guild of America Awards. Goodwin received the Best Animated Female award from the Alliance of Women Film Journalists and received nominations from the People's Choice Awards, and the Washington D.C. Area Film Critics Association. Musician Sia and music producers Stargate garnered a nomination for the Grammy Award for Best Song Written for Visual Media for "Try Everything", performed by Shakira. The American Film Institute included Zootopia in their list of the top ten of 2016.

Accolades

Notes

References

External links
 

Lists of accolades by film
Disney-related lists